Caroline Renate Pickardt (born 5 September 1936) is a German endocrinologist. The main focus of her scientific work is in the area of thyroid diseases (thyroidology). She published fundamental articles on functional thyroid disorders and the pathophysiology of goitre.

Biography 

After receiving her doctorate in 1965 at the University of Munich with a dissertation titled "Veränderungen des Sekretintestes bei subaciden, cholecystektomierten und pankreaskranken Patienten" (Changes of the secretin test in subacid patients after cholecystectomy and with pancreatic diseases) she habilitated in 1972 at the Ludwig-Maximilian University with a treatise titled "Stimulation der TSH-Sekretion durch TRH (Thyrotropin Releasing Hormone): diagnostische Bedeutung und pathophysiologische Folgerungen" (Stimulation of thyrotropin secretion by TRH (thyrotropin releasing hormone): diagnostic utility and pathophysiological consequences). On January 18, 1973, she was appointed Privatdozent, in 1979 Professor.

During her scientific life Pickard managed a number of scientific conferences and published more than 80 papers and several books on thyroid disorders and endocrine ophthalmopathy. Together with Rudolf Fahlbusch she described a form of tertiary hypothyroidism in pituitary stalk transection syndrome (Pickardt-Fahlbusch syndrome).

Since 2001 she has been an emeritus professor.

Selected publications 

 C. R. Pickardt, W. Geiger, R. Fahlbusch und P. C. Scriba. Stimulation der TSH-Sekretion durch TRF-Belastung bei hypothalamischen und hypophysären Krankheitsbildern. Klin. Wschr. (1972) 50, 42–59
 Johannes Köbberling, Caroline R. Pickardt (Hrsg.). Struma. Springer Berlin Heidelberg 1990. 
 Reinhard Ziegler, Caroline R. Pickardt, Rolf-Peter Willig. Rationelle Diagnostik in der Endokrinologie. Georg-Thieme-Verlag Stuttgart 1993.

References 

People from Plettenberg
German endocrinologists
Women endocrinologists
20th-century women scientists
1936 births
Living people
Ludwig Maximilian University of Munich alumni